Northwest Trail is a 1945 American contemporary Western film directed by Derwin Abrahams shot in Cinecolor at Lake Hemet, California. It stars Bob Steele, Joan Woodbury, and Madge Bellamy making a comeback appearance in her final film.

Plot
Royal Canadian Mounted Police (RCMP) Trooper O'Brien assists Kate Owens when her car breaks down.  Upon arrival at headquarters, his Inspector-in-charge assigns him to escort Kate to visit her Uncle in Morgan's Post located in the backwoods.  As there are no roads to the area the two must travel by horse.  O'Brien has two other tasks when he arrives; to discover why RCMP Sergeant Means has not filed a report in months and to investigate the complaint of Poodles Hanneford who alleges that the river going through his property has been blocked off and he has been fired upon when investigating.

What begins as a screwball comedy film between the witty Kate and strait-laced Mountie takes many unexpected turns when a rider steals Kate's suitcase that contains $20,000 but the rider is found shot to death with the money missing. Upon arrival in Morgan's Post Sgt Means chastises O'Brien for his incompetence and orders him back to headquarters.

Cast 
Bob Steele as RCMP Matt O'Brien
Joan Woodbury as Kate Owens
John Litel as Sergeant Means
Raymond Hatton as Morgan
Madge Bellamy as Mrs. Yeager
Ian Keith as Inspector McGrath
George Meeker as Whitey Yeager
Charles B. Middleton as Pierre
John Hamilton as John Owens
Poodles Hanneford as Poodles Hanneford
 Gracie Hanneford as Jill Hanneford

References

External links 

1945 films
1945 Western (genre) films
Films based on short fiction
Royal Canadian Mounted Police in fiction
Cinecolor films
American Western (genre) films
Lippert Pictures films
American black-and-white films
Northern (genre) films
Films based on works by James Oliver Curwood
Films directed by Derwin Abrahams
1940s English-language films
1940s American films